80 (Greek: Ογδόντα) is the name of a studio album by popular Greek singer Tolis Voskopoulos. It was released in September, 1980 by Minos EMI in Greece and it went gold selling over 50,000 units. The original release was in stereo on vinyl and cassette.

Track listing 

Side One.
 "Ki' eleges" - (Thanasis Polykandriotis-Sophie Pappa) - 3:01 - (Greek: Κι' έλεγες)
 "Kardia mou, kardia mou" feat. Marinella - (Thanasis Polykandriotis-Sophie Pappa) - 2:31 - (Greek: Καρδιά μου, καρδιά μου)
 "Ti na poume tora, ti" feat. Marinella - (Giorgos Katsaros-Mimis Theiopoulos) - 3:03 - (Greek: Τι να πούμε τώρα, τι)
 "Ase, min to kourazis" - (Giorgos Katsaros-Mimis Theiopoulos) - 2:46 - (Greek: Άσε, μην το κουράζεις)
 "Monachos mou kouventiazo" feat. Marinella - (Giorgos Katsaros-Mimis Theiopoulos) - 2:29 - (Greek: Μοναχός μου κουβεντιάζω)
 "Ah ke na 'cha fragka" feat. Marinella - (Nikos Lavranos-Yiannis Parios) - 2:31 - (Greek: Αχ και να 'χα φράγκα)
 "Mi fygis" - (Giorgos Katsaros-Mimis Theiopoulos) - 2:58 - (Greek: Μη φύγεις)
Side Two.
 "Ela min argis" - (Jean Musy-Laurence Matalon-Yiannis Parios) - 2:54 - (Greek: Έλα μην αργείς)
 "Ti les kale, ti les kale" - (Nikos Lavranos-Yiannis Parios) - 2:01 - (Greek: Τι λες καλέ, τι λες καλέ)
 "Minale ta matia" feat. Marinella - (Giorgos Katsaros-Yiannis Parios) - 2:31 - (Greek: Μιλάνε τα μάτια)
 "Ise pantou" feat. Marinella - (Giorgos Katsaros-Mimis Theiopoulos) - 2:24 - (Greek: Είσαι παντού)
 "Kita, yelao ki' as ponao" - (Thanasis Polykandriotis-Sophie Pappa) - 2:22 - (Greek: Κοίτα, γελάω κι' ας πονάω)
 "Afti i gineka ine diki mou" - (Nini Zaha) - 2:20 - (Greek: Αυτή η γυναίκα είναι δική μου)
 "Parelthon thelo na yinis" - (Yiannis Parios) - 3:43 - (Greek: Παρελθόν θέλω να γίνεις)

Personnel 
 Tolis Voskopoulos - vocals
 Marinella - background vocals
 Achilleas Theofilou - producer
 Giorgos Katsaros - arranger and conductor on tracks 3, 4, 5, 7, 10 and 11
 Nikos Lavranos - arranger and conductor on tracks 1, 2, 6, 8, 9, 12, 13 and 14
 Yiannis Smyrneos - recording engineer
 Alinta Mavrogeni - photographer
 Spyros Karachristos - artwork

References

1980 albums
Tolis Voskopoulos albums
Greek-language albums
Minos EMI albums